The Richmond Group also known as the Richmond School, is a group of American Impressionist painters who worked in the Richmond, Indiana, area from the late 19th Century through the mid-20th Century. While the Richmond Group had no formal organization, many of the artists were affiliated with, and exhibited at, the Art Association of Richmond, Indiana, now known as the Richmond Art Museum.

Though not definitive, the following is a list of artists considered a part of the Richmond Group:

George Herbert Baker
John Elwood Bundy
Francis Focer Brown
Charles H. Clawson
Albert Clinton Conner
Charles Conner
Maude Kaufman Eggemeyer
W. A. Eyden Sr.
William A. Eyden Jr.
Edgar Forkner
Frank J. Girardin
Albert W. Gregg
William A. Holly
Lawrence McConaha
Ellwood Morris
Alden Mote
Anna M. Newman
Micajah Thomas Nordyke
Fred Pearce Jr.
Fred Pearce Sr.
John Albert Seaford

See also
Hoosier Group
Irvington Group
Richmond Art Museum

References
 Burnet, Mary Q. Art and Artists of Indiana. New York; The Century Co., 1921.

External links
 Artist information at Waynet

American artist groups and collectives
American Impressionism
Richmond
Indiana culture
Richmond, Indiana
Arts organizations based in Indiana